Leaper(s) may refer to:

 Batroc the Leaper, fictional villain from Marvel Comics
 Adrian Leaper, English conductor of classical music
 Leapers, fairy chess pieces that move by a fixed type of vector between their start squares and their arrival squares
 Little Leaper, amusement ride located in Altoona, Pennsylvania, USA
 "The Leaper", brand logo of Jaguar Cars as well as the name of the banned, iconic hood ornament
 Water leaper, a creature from Welsh folklore
 A person born on February 29

See also
Leeper (disambiguation)
Leiper (a surname)